Secrets of the Whales is a 2021 nature documentary television series that depicts a variety of whale species in a variety of habitats. The first episode aired April 22, 2021, on National Geographic, as well as being released on Disney+. It was filmed across 24 locations and took 3 years in production. Brian Skerry originated the show concept in 2008, after writing an article for National Geographic about endangered whale species.

The series won the 2021 Primetime Creative Arts Emmy Award for Outstanding Documentary or Nonfiction Series. It received positive review from critics.

Premise 
The television series follows the life, culture, and behavior of different whale species across the globe.

Featured whales

Episodes

Release 
Secrets of the Whales premiered on April 22, 2021, on Disney+ and National Geographic for Earth Day.

Reception

Critical reception 
On the review aggregator website Rotten Tomatoes, 92% of 12 critics' reviews are positive, with an average rating of 8.60/10. Metacritic, which uses a weighted average, assigned the film a score of 89 out of 100, based on 4 critics, indicating "universal acclaim."

Mike Hale of The New York Times found the visuals exciting, stating that the shots manage to provide a deep emotion for the audience, while claiming that the series emphasizes the intelligence and the social skills of whales. John Serba of Decider stated that the series succeeds to distinguish itself from other wildlife documentaries, claiming it provides fairly scientific data and very satisfying visuals that manage to capture the attention of the audience. Richard Roeper of Chicago Sun-Times gave the series a 4 out of 4 stars rating, claimed that the documentary succeeds to explore the behavior and culture of different whale species scientifically, found the visuals of the series astonishing across its photography, while saying that Sigourney Weaver was the ideal choice as the narrator. Joly Herman of Common Sense Media rated the series 4 out of 5 stars and acclaimed the education value, claiming that the documentary succeeds to portray the intelligence and culture of whales, praised the positive messages and role models, stating that Secrets of the Whales depicts the importance of love, teamwork, and creativity among the whales to the survival of their species, while complimenting Weaver's performance.

Accolades

References

External links
 
 

2021 American television series debuts
National Geographic (American TV channel) original programming
Primetime Emmy Award-winning television series
Whales